This is a list of youngest killers.  Individuals in this list are documented to be age 17 or younger.



Younger than age 13 
<div style="overflow-x:auto;>
{| class="wikitable sortable" width="100%" style="font-size: 100%"
|-
! Name
! Date of birth
! Date of killing(s)
! Age at time of killing(s)
! Location
! Country
! Killed
! Injured
! Penalty of perpetrator(s)
! Current status of perpetrator(s)
! Ref.
|-
|Ms. Ziapasa
|1902–1903
|April 12, 1906
|3
|Benwood, West Virginia
|
|
|
|Not charged due to her age.
|Deceased
|
|-
|Retta McCabe
|1892–1893
|October 30, 1897
|4 
|Troy, New York
|
|
|
|Not charged due to her age.
|Deceased
|
|-
| Carl Newton Mahan
| September 22, 1922
| May 18, 1929
| 6 years, 7 months and 26 days
| Paintsville, Johnson County, Kentucky
| 
| 
| 
| Arrested, sentenced to 15 years in reform school, but did not serve a sentence after the judge reviewed the case
| Deceased
| 
|-
| Dedrick Owens
| 1993
| February 29, 2000
| 6 
| Buell Elementary School, Mount Morris Township, Michigan
| 
| 
| 
| He could not be legally charged with murder because of his age. Was expelled from school and was sent to live with family member
| Unknown
|  
|-
|Lizzie Cook
|1892–1893
|February 27, 1899
|6 
|Birmingham, Alabama
|
|
|
|
|Deceased
|
|-
|Virginia Hudson
|?
|July 23, 1887
|7 
|Granville, South Carolina
|
|
|
|Arrested and charged with murder
|Deceased
|
|-
|Robert Robertson
|?
|1908
|7 
|Launceston, Tasmania
|
|
|
|Arrested and charged with murder
|Deceased
|
|-
| Amarjeet Sada
| 1998
| 2006–2007
| 8
| Begusarai, Bihar
| 
| 
| 
| Arrested and taken into custody
| Unknown
| 
|- 
| Carroll Cole
| May 9, 1938
| 1946
| 8
| Richmond, California
| 
| 
| 
| The murder was not discovered until he later confessed; he murdered at least 15 more victims during adulthood. He was executed by lethal injection on December 6, 1985
| Deceased
| 
|-
|Unnamed girl
|?
|1867
|8
|Cassville, Missouri
|
|
|
|Found insane
|Deceased
|
|-
|Patrick Knowles
|?
|May 1903
|8
|Stockton-on-Tees, England
|
|
|
|Arrested, sentenced to detention at Her Majesty's pleasure; served 9 years in prison
|Deceased
|
|- 
| Christian Romero
| December 29, 1999
| November 5, 2008
| 8 years, 10 months and 7 days
| St. Johns, Arizona
| 
| 
| 
| The charge for the killings was dropped, and he was sentenced to an indefinite stay in a youth treatment center near Phoenix. He later moved to a group home and then a foster home
| Released
| 
|-
|Mary Cooper
|?
|1885
|9
|Richmond, Virginia
|
|
|
|Arrested
|Deceased
|
|-
| Unnamed boy
| ?
| May 6, 2019
| 9
| Fawn River Township, Michigan
| 
| 
| 
| The charge for the killings was dropped
| Released
| 
|-
|Kyle Alwood
|?
|April 6, 2019
|9
|Goodfield, Illinois
|
|
|
|Charged with murder.
|In custody
|
|-
| Cayetano Santos Godino
| October 31, 1896
| March 29, 1906 – December 3, 1912
| 9 years, 4 months and 29 days – 16 years, 1 month and 3 days
| Buenos Aires
| 
| 
| 
| The first murder was not discovered until he later confessed; in 1912 (aged 15–16) he killed three other victims; he was arrested several times, and the last one was between 1912 and 1944
| Deceased
| 
|- 
| Unnamed boy
| 2011-2012
| September 2022
| 10 
|Haicheng Township, Heilongjiang
| 
|
| 
| Arrested along with a few of his friends who encouraged him to do it
| Unknown
| 
|- 
| William York
| 1738
| May 13, 1748
| 10
| Suffolk
| 
| 
| 
| Sentenced to death and later pardoned
| Deceased
| 
|-
| James Osmanson
| c. 1983–1984
| April 12, 1994
| 10
| Butte, Montana
| 
| 
| 
| Was not sent to jail but received treatment at a residential facility.
| Released
| 
|-
| Joseph Mcvay
| 2000
| January 2, 2011
| 10
| Big Prairie, Ohio
| 
| 
| 
| Held in a youth facility to be sentenced when he is 21-years-old
| Incarcerated
| 
|-
|Unnamed girl
|?
|September 18, 2010
|10
|Sandy Springs, Georgia
|
|
|
|Arrested and charged with murder
|
|
|-
|Jane Walker
|?
|1886
|10
|Orangeburg, South Carolina
|
|
|
|Arrested and charged with murder
|Deceased
|
|-
| James Arcene
| c. 1862
| ?
| 10
| Fort Gibson, Oklahoma
| 
| 
| 
| Arrested and sentenced to death
| Executed on June 18, 1885
|
|-
| Robert Thompson and Jon Venables
| August 23, 1982, and August 13, 1982
| February 12, 1993
| Thompson: 10 years, 5 months and 20 daysVenables: 10 years, 5 months and 30 days
| Liverpool, Merseyside
| 
| 
| 
| Both arrested, sentenced to 10 years in prison; were released in 2001 after serving eight years
| Released
|
|-
| Unnamed boy
| ?
| August 21, 2013
| 10
| Broadview, Saskatchewan
| 
| 
| 
| Arrested; could not be criminally charged because he was a child
| In the custody of the province
| 
|-
| George Green
| c. 1839
| October 26, 1849
| 10
| Kawartha Lakes, Ontario
| 
| 
| 
| Sentenced to death at age 11, sentence later commuted to life in prison at Kingston Pen
| Died at Kingston Pen on August 21, 1852
| 
|-
| Joseph Hall
| June 19, 2000
| May 1, 2011
| 10 years, 10 months and 12 days
| Riverside, California
| 
| 
| 
| Arrested and sentenced to imprisonment until he reaches the age of 23
| Incarcerated
|
|-
| Mary Bell
| May 26, 1957
| May 25 – July 31, 1968
| 10 years and 364 days – 11 years, 1 month and 7 days
| Scotswood, Newcastle upon Tyne
| 
| 
| 
| Arrested, sentenced to detention at Her Majesty's pleasure; served 12 years in prison; accomplice Norma Joyce Bell (no relation) was acquitted after found that she took no part in the actual murders
| Released
|
|-
| Anton Wood
| 1881
| November 1892
| 11
| Denver, Colorado
| 
| 
| 
| Sentenced to 25 years to life in prison
| Deceased
| 
|-
| Nellie Corneilson
| ?
| January 15, 1902
| 11
| Wichita, Kansas
| 
| 
| 
| Arrested and later sent to live with family member
| Deceased
| 
|-
| Nathaniel Abraham
| January 1986
| October 29, 1997
| 11 years and 9 months
| Detroit, Michigan
| 
| 
| 
| Arrested and imprisoned until his 21st birthday; went back to prison for more crimes committed in adulthood
| Incarcerated
| 
|-
| Andrew Golden
| May 25, 1986
| March 24, 1998
| 11 years, 9 months and 27 days
| Westside Middle School, Craighead County, Arkansas
| 
| 
| 
| Arrested, along with accomplice Mitchell Johnson, imprisoned until his 21st birthday
| Deceased
|
|-
|  Natsumi Tsuji 
| c. 1992–1993
| June 1, 2004
| 11
| Sasebo, Nagasaki Prefecture
| 
| 
| 
|
| Arrested/Institutionalized
|
|-
| Nathan Faris
| c. 1974–1975
| March 2, 1987
| 12
| De Kalb, Missouri
| 
| 
| 
| Died by suicide
| Deceased
| 
|- 
| Unnamed boy
| c. 1987–1988
| January 2000
| 12
| Bristol
| 
| 
| 
|
| Arrested
| 
|-
| Piedad Martínez del Águila
| 1953
| December 4, 1965, to January 4, 1966
| 12
| Murcia
| 
| 
| 
| Arrested/Institutionalized
| Unknown
| 
|-
|Mary Maher
|?
|August 21  – September 8, 1906
|12
|Dunkitt, County Kilkeny
|
|
|
| Died by suicide
|Deceased
|
|-
| Jose Reyes
| July 2, 2001
| October 21, 2013
| 12 years, 3 months and 19 days
| Sparks Middle School, Sparks, Nevada
| 
| 
| 
| Died by suicide
| Deceased
|
|-
| Lionel Tate
| January 30, 1987
| July 28, 1999
| 12 years, 5 months and 28 days
| Broward County, Florida
| 
| 
| 
| Arrested and originally sentenced to Life without parole which was reduced to one year's house arrest and 10 years' probation and was sent back to prison for violating his probation and committing armed robbery and sentenced to 30 years imprisonment with a 10-year sentence to run concurrently
| Incarcerated
|
|-
| Christopher Pittman
| April 9, 1989
| November 28, 2001
| 12 years, 7 months and 19 days
| Chester, South Carolina
| 
| 
| 
| Arrested and originally sentenced to 30 years to life in prison which was reduced to 25 years on appeal
| Incarcerated
|
|-
| Hannah Ocuish
| March 1774
| July 21, 1786
| 12 years and 9 months
| New London, Connecticut
| 
| 
| 
| Sentenced to death
| Executed on December 20, 1786
|
|-
| Evan Drake Savoie and Jake Lee Eakin
| c. 1990–1991
| February 15, 2003
| Both 12
| Ephrata, Washington
| 
| 
| 
| 14 years in prison (Eakin), 26 years in prison reduced to 20 years after appeal (Savoie)
| Released (Eakin), Released (Savoie)
|
|-
| Jasmine Richardson
| c. 1993–1994
| April 23, 2006
| 12
| Medicine Hat, Alberta
| 
| 
| 
| Arrested and sentenced to 10 years imprisonment
| Released
|
|-
| Chen
| 2006
| December 2, 2018
| 12
| Yuanjiang, Hunan
| 
| 
| 
|
| Released
| 
|-
| Curtis Fairchild Jones
| 1987
| January 6, 1999
| 12
| Port St. John, Florida
| 
| 
| 
| Sentenced to 17 years in prison along with his 13-year-old sister Catherine for murder
| Released
| 
|-
| Unnamed boy
| ?
| September 29, 2019
| 12
| São Paulo
| 
| 
| 
| Sentenced to 3 years in prison
| Incarcerated
| 
|-
| Alex King
| 1989
| November 26, 2001
| 12
| Cantonment, Florida
| 
| 
| 
| Killed his father.  Arrested along with his accomplice, his older brother Derek (age 13), and sentenced to 7 years in prison.
| Released in 2009
| 
|-
| Danny Charles Preddie
| 1988
| November 27, 2000
| 12
| London
| 
| 
| 
| Arrested along with his accomplice, his older brother Ricky, and sentenced to 8 years in prison.
| Released in 2011
| 
|-
| Unnamed boy
| ?
| October 18, 2019
| 12
| Curitiba
| 
| 
| 
| Temporarily detained for 45 days
| Incarcerated
| 
|-
| Howard Lang
| 1935
| October 18, 1947
| 12
| Chicago, Illinois
| 
| 
| 
| Arrested, sentenced to 22 years in prison after first trial
| Acquitted on appeal in second trial after being judged too young to be responsible for his actions; released under supervision.
| 
|-
| Edwin Debrow
| 1979
| September 21, 1991
| 12
| San Antonio, Texas
| 
| 
| 
| Arrested, sentenced to 27 years in prison.
| Released in 2019
|

Age 13 to 17 
<div style="overflow-x:auto;>
{| class="wikitable sortable" width="100%" style="font-size: 100%"
|-
! Name
! Date of birth
! Date of killing(s)
! Age at time of killing(s)
! Location
! Country
! Killed
! Injured
! Penalty of perpetrator(s)
! Current status of perpetrator(s)
! Ref.
|-
| Unnamed boy
| 2008
| May 2022
| 13
| Kuwait City
| 
| 
| 
|None. ISIS-directed atrocity.
|Unknown
|
|-
|James Watson
| April 1, 1981
|November 28, 1994
|13
|Peterborough
|
|
|
|Was not arrested for the murder until the mid 2010s, sentenced to life in prison with a minimum of 15 years before release
|Incarcerated
|
|-
| Mary Brinker
| ?
| May 14, 1837
| 13–16
| Crawford County, Missouri
| 
| 
| 
| Executed
| Deceased
| 
|-
| Catherine Nicole Jones
| June 6, 1985
| January 6, 1999
| 13
| Port St. John, Florida
| 
| 
| 
| Sentenced to 17 years in prison, along with her 12-year-old brother Curtis, for murder.
| Released
| 
|-
| Max Porta
| ?
| April 20, 2015
| 13
| Barcelona, Catalonia
| 
| 
| 
| He could not be legally charged with murder because of his age
| Unknown
| 
|- 
| Unnamed boy
| ?
| June 25, 2013
| 13
| Fort Worth, Texas
| 
| 
| 
| Sentenced to 23 years in prison.
| Incarcerated
| 
|-
|Unnamed boy
|?
|July 23, 1994
|13
|Hommelheide, Susteren
|
|
|
|Arrested
|Unknown
|
|-
| Ricky Gavin Preddie
| 1987
| November 27, 2000
| 13
| London
| 
| 
| 
| Arrested along with his accomplice, his younger brother Danny, and sentenced to 8 years in prison; released on September 8, 2010, was recalled on March 13, 2011, for associating with gang members. He was released and recalled several more times.
| Incarcerated
| 
|-
| Nickalas Kedrowitz
| ?
| May 1 – July 20, 2017
| 13
| Osgood, Indiana
| 
| 
| 
| Arrested, sentenced to 100 years in prison
| Imprisoned
| 
|-
| Marcelo Eduardo Bovo Pesseghini
| ?
| August 5, 2013
| 13
| São Paulo
| 
| 
| 
| Died by suicide
| Deceased
| 
|-
| Derek King
| 1988
| November 26, 2001
| 13
| Cantonment, Florida
| 
| 
| 
| Killed his father. Arrested along with his accomplice, his younger brother Alex (age 12), and sentenced to 8 years in prison.
| Released in 2009
| 
|-
| Carrie Sampson
| ?
| August 17, 1899
| 13
| Tallahassee, Florida
| 
| 
| 
| Arrested
| 
| 
|-
| Clive Beckett
| 1908
| May 25, 1922
| 13
| Biggenden, Queensland
| 
| 
| 
| Arrested, sentenced to state care at Palm Island industrial school until the age of 18
| Arrested again in 1950 for assaulting his wife
| 
|-
|-
| Two unnamed boys
| c. 2004–2005
| May 14, 2018
| 13
| Lucan, Fingal
| 
| 
| 
| (Boy A) Life imprisonment to be reviewed after twelve years
(Boy B) Fifteen years imprisonment to be reviewed after eight years
| Detained at Oberstown Children Detention Campus; will be transferred to adult prison once they pass 18 years of age
|
|-
|Ida Schell
|?
|1907
|13
|?
|
|
|
|
|Deceased
|
|-
|Ronald Sanford Jr.
|February 12, 1974
|August 18, 1987
|13, 6 months and 6 days
|Indianapolis, Indiana
|
|
|
|Arrested, sentenced to 170 years in prison
|Incarcerated
|
|-
| Eric Smith
| January 22, 1980
| August 2, 1993
| 13, 6 months and 11 days
| Steuben County, New York
| 
| 
| 
| Sentenced to nine years to life in prison
| Released in February 2022
| 
|-
| Mitchell Johnson
| August 11, 1984
| March 24, 1998
| 13, 7 months and 13 days
| Westside Middle School, Craighead County, Arkansas
| 
| 
| 
| Arrested, along with accomplice Andrew Golden, imprisoned until his 21st birthday
| Released
| 
|-
| Nathaniel Brazill
| September 22, 1986
| May 26, 2000
| 13, 8 months and 4 days
| Lake Worth Middle School, Lake Worth, Florida
| 
| 
| 
| Sentenced to 28 years imprisonment, plus 7 years felony probation
| Incarcerated
| 
|-
| Craig Price
| October 11, 1973
| July 27, 1987 – September 1, 1989
| 13 years, 9 months and 16 days - 15 years, 10 months and 21 days
| Warwick, Rhode Island
| 
| 
| 
| Arrested
| Incarcerated
| 
|-
| Two unnamed females
| c. 1999–2000
| December 2014
| 13 and 14
| Hartlepool
| 
| 
| 
| Both arrested and sentenced to a minimum of 15 years imprisonment
| Both incarcerated
| 
|-
| Two unnamed youths
| ?
| October 19, 2019
| 13 and 15
| Porto Velho
| 
| 
| 
| Arrested
| 
| 
|-
| Brooks Bellay
| June 6, 1965
| August 20, 1979
| 14
| Vero Beach, Florida
| 
| 
| 
| Sentenced to life with parole
| Incarcerated
| 
|-
|Unnamed boy
|?
|September 2017
|14
|Katlijk
|
|
|
|
|Incarcerated
|
|-
| Pedro Rodrigues Filho
| July 17, 1954
| 1968
| 14
| Santa Rita do Sapucaí
| 
| 
| 
| Was at large after the first crime, and in the following years he committed dozens of other murders. Was arrested in 1973 and released in 2007, but was arrested again in 2011 and released in 2018
| Released
| 
|-
| Paul Jensen
| c. 1981-1982
|  January 1996
| 14
| Fort Pierre, South Dakota
| 
| 
| 
| Arrested and sentenced to life without parole, later changed to 200 years
| Imprisoned
| 
|- 
| Evan Miller
| 1988
|  July 15, 2003
| 14
| Moulton, Alabama
| 
| 
| 
| Arrested and sentenced to life without parole
| Incarcerated
| 
|- 
| Heather Smith
| c. 1971
| November 26, 1985
| 14
| Spanaway, Washington
| 
| 
| 
| Died by suicide
| Deceased
| 
|-
| Keith E. Johnson
| December 20, 1980
| September 29, 1995
| 14
| Tavares, Florida
| 
| 
| 
| Sentenced to life without parole plus 10 years
| Imprisoned
| 
|-
| Anna Bell
| ?
| 1895
| 14
| Fairfield County, South Carolina
| 
| 
| 
| Arrested
| Deceased
| 
|-
| Hermann Koppes
| 1899
| 1913
| 14
| Elgin, Illinois
| 
| 
| 
| Arrested, sentenced to life in prison
| Deceased
|  
|-
| James Ortega
| December 22, 1989
| January 3, 2004
| 14 years and 12 days
| San Jose, California
| 
| 
| 
| Arrested, sentenced to 36 years to life in prison
| Incarcerated
| 
|-
| Brandon McInerney
| January 24, 1994
| February 11, 2008
| 14 years and 18 days
| E.O. Green Junior High School, Oxnard, California
| 
| 
| 
| Arrested and sentenced to 21 years in prison
| Incarcerated
| 
|-
| Jesse Harding Pomeroy
| November 29, 1859
| February–April 1874
| 14 years and 2 months
| Charlestown, Boston, Massachusetts
| 
| 
| 
| Arrested and sentenced to death which was reduced to life imprisonment
| Deceased
| 
|-
| Caril Ann Fugate
| July 30, 1943
| January 21, 1958
| 14, 5 months and 22 days
| Lincoln, Nebraska
| 
| 
| 
| Arrested, along with her accomplice and boyfriend Charles Starkweather
| Released
| 
|-
| Michael Carneal
| June 1, 1983
| December 1, 1997
| 14 years and 6 months
| Heath High School, West Paducah, Kentucky
| 
| 
| 
| Arrested and sentenced to life imprisonment with the possibility of parole in 25 years
| Incarcerated
| 
|-
| Joshua Phillips
| March 17, 1984
| November 3, 1998
| 14 years, 7 months and 17 days
| Jacksonville, Florida
| 
| 
| 
| Arrested and sentenced to life without parole
| Incarcerated
| 
|-
| Philip Chism
| January 1, 1999
| October 22, 2013
| 14 years, 9 months and 1 day
| Danvers, Massachusetts
| 
| 
| 
| Arrested and sentenced to life imprisonment with the possibility of parole in 40 years 
| Incarcerated
|
|-
| Barry Dale Loukaitis
| February 26, 1981
| February 2, 1996
| 14 years, 11 months and 7 days
| Frontier Middle School, Moses Lake, Washington
| 
| 
| 
| Arrested and sentenced to two life sentences and an additional 205 years without the possibility of parole but resentenced to 189 years in prison.
| Incarcerated
| 
|-
| Alfonza Smalls
| August 18, 1978
| January 30, 1993
| 14
| Eustis, Florida
| 
| 
| 
| Arrested and sentenced to life without parole
| Incarnated
| 
|-
| Seito Sakakibara
| c. 1992–1993
| March 16 – May 27, 1997
| 14
| Kobe, Hyogo
| 
| 
| 
| Arrested
| Released
| 
|-
| Andrew Jerome Wurst
| c. 1983–1984
| April 24, 1998
| 14
| Edinboro, Pennsylvania
| 
| 
| 
| Arrested and sentenced to 30 to 60 years in prison
| Incarcerated
| 
|-
| Todd Cameron Smith
| c. 1984–1985
| April 28, 1999
| 14
| W. R. Myers High School, Taber, Alberta
| 
| 
| 
| Arrested
| Released, arrested again in 2005
| 
|-
| Kenneth Bartley, Jr.
| c. 2000–2001
| November 8, 2005
| 14
| Campbell County Comprehensive High School, Jacksboro, Tennessee
| 
| 
| 
| Arrested
| Released, arrested again several times since
| 
|-
| Jesse Osborne
| c. 2001–2002
| September 28, 2016
| 14
| Townville Elementary School, Townville, South Carolina
| 
| 
| 
| Arrested and sentenced to life without parole plus 30 years
| Incarcerated
| 
|-
| Kim Edwards and Lucas Markham
| June 13, 2001, and August 1, 2001
| April 12, 2016
| 14
| Spalding, Lincolnshire
|  
| 
| 
| Arrested and both sentenced life with a minimum of 17-and-a-half years imprisonment
| both Incarcerated
| 
|-
| Sandy Charles
| 1980
| July 8, 1995
| 14
| La Ronge
| 
| 
| 
| Arrested, along with accomplice William Martin; found not guilty by reason of insanity and sent to psychiatric center
| Incarcerated
| 
|-
| Łukasz Wach
| 2005
| January 25, 2020
| 14
| Chełm
| 
| 
| 
| Arrested, found not guilty by reason of insanity and sent to psychiatric center
| Incarcerated
| 
|-
| Nikolai Dudin
| 1973
|  December 3, 1987
|  14 years
| Furmanov, Ivanovo Oblast
| 
| 
| 
| Killed his father, and later 12 more people as an adult
| Incarcerated
| 
|-
|Jaap van der H.
|?
|November 17, 2009
|14
|Urk
|
|
|
|Arrested and given a 1-year sentence
|
|
|-
| Graham Young
| September 7, 1947
| April 21, 1962
| 14
| Neasden, London
| 
| 
| 
| Arrested after he killed his stepmother, was released eight years later, and went on to kill another 2 victims as an adult
| Deceased
| 
|-
| Unnamed boy 
| 2006
|  January 21, 2021 
| 14
| Dublin
| 
| 
| 
| Life imprisonment, with review after 13 years
| Detained at Oberstown Children Detention Campus; will be transferred to adult prison once he passes 18 years of age
| 
|-
|Unnamed girl
|
|1894
|14
|Hospital in Novgorod
|
|
|
|Arrested
|Deceased
|
|-
| Z (underaged killer)
| December 31, 1985 (possibly)
| May 14, 2001
| 15
| Hougang, Singapore
| 
| 
| 
| Indefinite detention at the President's Pleasure
| Released on December 2, 2018, after serving 17 years in prison
| 
|-
|2 unnamed boys
|?
|December 13, 2017
|15
|Almere
|
|
|
|Arrested
|Unknown
|
|-
|Yasin N.
|?
|April 29, 2017
|15
|Zaandam
|
|
|
|
|
|
|-
| Justin Wade Trammell
| 1984
| September 26, 1999
| 15 years 
| Bentonville, Arkansas
| 
| 
| 
| Arrested
| Released and rearrasted several times for crimes committed as an adult
| 
|-
| Charles Andrew Williams
| February 8, 1986
| March 5, 2001
| 15 years and 25 days
| Santana High School, Santee, California
| 
| 
| 
| Arrested and sentenced to 50 years to life in prison
| Incarcerated
| 
|-
| Jaylen Ray Fryberg
| July 31, 1999
| October 24, 2014
| 15 years, 2 months and 24 days
| Marysville Pilchuck High School, Marysville, Washington
| 
| 
| 
| Died by suicide
| Deceased
| 
|-
| Sergey Gordeyev
| October 4, 1998
| February 3, 2014
| 15 years, 3 months and 30 days
| School No. 263, Otradnoye District, Moscow
| 
| 
| 
| Arrested
| 
| 
|-
| Eric Hainstock
| April 4, 1991
| September 29, 2006
| 15 years, 5 months, and 25 days
| Cazenovia, Wisconsin
| 
| 
| 
| Arrested and sentenced to life imprisonment with eligibility for parole in 2037
| Incarcerated
| 
|-
|Marie-Françoise Bougaran
|September 4, 1850
|November 12–25 1865
|15 and a half
|Finistère
|
|
|
|Arrested and sentenced to 20 years in prison
|Deceased
|
|-
| Vadzim Milashevsky
| June 26, 2003
| February 11, 2019
| 15 years, 7 months, and 16 days
| Stowbtsy
| 
| 
| 
| Arrested and sentenced to 13 years in prison
| Imprisoned
| 
|-
| Edmund Kemper
| December 18, 1948
| August 27, 1964
| 15 years, 8 months, 9 days
| North Fork, California
| 
| 
| 
| Arrested after he killed his grandparents, was released six years later, and went on to kill another 8 victims as an adult
| Incarcerated
|
|-
| Kazutaka Komori
| c. 1943
| 1961
| 15
| Tokyo
| 
| 
| 
| Arrested
| Deceased
| 
|-
| Willie Francis
| January 12, 1929
| 1944
| 15
| St. Martinville, Louisiana
| 
| 
| 
| Arrested; executed in 1947 at age 18
| Deceased
| 
|-
| Alyssa Bustamante
| 1994
| October 21, 2009
| 15
| St. Martins, Missouri
| 
| 
| 
| Arrested and sentenced to life imprisonment with the possibility of conditional release
| Incarcerated
| 
|-
| Nick Clatterbuck
| c. 1968–1969
| February 28, 1984
| 15
| Utah County, Utah
| 
| 
| 
| Arrested and sentenced to 5 years to life
| Incarcerated
| 
|-
| Jamar Siler
| c. 1992–1993
| August 21, 2008
| 15
| Knoxville, Tennessee
| 
| 
| 
| Arrested and sentenced to 30 years
| 
| 
|-
| Unnamed boy
| ?
| October 10, 2019
| 15
| London
| 
| 
| 
| Arrested
| 
| 
|-
| Edgar Yoevani
| c.1999
| May 6, 2014
| 15
| Tlalnepantla, Mexico
| 
| 
| 
| Arrested
| 
| 
|-
| Toni Lawrence
| February 1976
| January 11, 1992
| 15
| Madison, Indiana
| 
| 
| 
| Arrested, along with three other accomplices
| Released
| 
|-
| Hope Rippey
| June 1976
| January 11, 1992
| 15
| Madison, Indiana
| 
| 
| 
| Arrested, along with three other accomplices
| Released
| 
|-
| Steven Washington
| July 27, 1948
| August 28 – December 30, 1963
| 15
| St. Petersburg, Florida
| 
| 
| 
| Arrested and sentenced to life in prison
| Deceased
|
|-
| Nehemiah Griego
| c. 1997–1998
| January 19, 2013
| 15
| South Valley, New Mexico
| 
| 
| 
| Arrested and sentenced to life with the possibility of parole in 30 years.
| Incarcerated
| 
|-
| Luke Mitchell
| c. 1987–1988
| June 30, 2003
| 15
| Easthouses, Scotland
| 
| 
| 
| Arrested
| Incarcerated
| 
|-
| Rafael Solich
| c. 1988–1989
| September 28, 2004
| 15
| Carmen de Patagones, Buenos Aires Province
| 
| 
| 
| Arrested
| Released
| 
|-
| Jared Padgett
| c. 1998–1999
| June 10, 2014
| 15
| Troutdale, Oregon
| 
| 
| 
| Died by suicide
| Deceased
| 
|-
| Don Steenkamp
| c. 1997
| April 6,  2012
| 15
| Griekwastad
| 
| 
| 
| Arrested
| 
| 
|-
| Jason McLaughlin
| c. 1987–1988
|  September 24, 2003 
| 15
| Cold Spring, Minnesota
| 
| 
| 
| Arrested
| Incarcerated
| 
|-
| James Fairweather
| c. 1998
| March 29, 2014
| 15
| Colchester, Essex
| 
| 
| 
| Arrested and sentenced to Life with minimum of 27 years
| Incarcerated
| 
|-
| Unknown 15-year-old girl
| c. 1998–1999
| July 26, 2014
| 15
| Sasebo, Nagasaki Prefecture
| 
| 
| 
| Arrested
| 
| 
|-
| Lisa Borch
| c. 1998–1999
| October 8, 2014
| 15
| Kvissel, Vendsyssel
| 
| 
| 
| Arrested and sentenced to 9 years in prison
| Incarcerated
| 
|-
| Unnamed boy
| ?
| May 13, 2015
| 15
| Goiânia
| 
| 
| 
| Arrested
| 
| 
|-
| Willie Bosket
| December 9, 1962
| March 19, 1978
| 15 years, 3 months and 10 days
| Harlem, New York
| 
| 
| 
| Arrested and currently serving 3 consecutive 25 to life sentences
| Incarcerated
| 
|-
| Jaivon White
| January 30, 2003
| September 19, 2018
| 15 years, 7 months and 20 days
| Waterbury, Connecticut
| 
| 
| 
| Arrested
| Awaiting trial 
| 
|-
| Unnamed boy
| ?
| October 31, 2019
| 15
| Londrina
| 
| 
| 
| 
| Taken into custody
| 
|-
| Juliet Hulme
| c. 1938
| October 28, 1954
| 15
| Victoria Park, Christchurch
| 
| 
| 
| Arrested and sentenced to 5 years in prison
| Released
| 
|-
| Jason Smith
| ?
| May 24, 1993
| 15
| Pennsburg, Pennsylvania
| 
| 
| 
| Arrested and sentenced to 12 to 25 years in prison
| unknown
| 
|-
|NF (Initials)
|?
|2020
|15 years
|Jakarta
|
|
|
|Turned herself in and sentenced to 2 years in prison
|Incarcerated
|
|-
|Juan Fernando Hermosa
|February 28, 1976
|November 22, 1991 – June 17, 1993
|15-17
|Quito, Ecuador
|
|
|
|Arrested and sentenced to four years in prison
|Assassinated
|
|-
| Paula Cooper
| August 25, 1969
| May 14, 1985
| 15 years, 8 months and 19 days
| Gary, Indiana
| 
| 
| 
| Arrested; released on June 17, 2013, died by suicide on May 26, 2015, 30 years after the murder
| Deceased
| 
|-
| Kipland Phillip Kinkel
| August 30, 1982
| May 21, 1998
| 15 years, 8 months and 21 days
| Thurston High School, Springfield, Oregon
| 
| 
| 
| Arrested and sentenced to 111 years in prison
| Incarcerated
| 
|-
| Akiyoshi Umekawa
| March 1, 1948
| December 16, 1963
| 15 years, 9 months and 15 days
| Ōtake, Hiroshima
| 
| 
| 
| Shot by police
| Deceased
| 
|-
| William Cornick
| June 26, 1998
| April 24, 2014
| 15 years, 9 months and 29 days
| Corpus Christi Catholic College, Halton Moor, Leeds
| 
| 
| 
| Arrested and sentenced to life with a minimum of 20 years
| Incarcerated
| 
|-
| Elmer Wayne Henley
| May 9, 1956
| March 24 1972 – August 8, 1973
| 15 years, 10 months and 15 days – 17 years, 5 months and 12 days
| Houston, Texas
| 
| 
| 
| Sentenced to 594 years (six consecutive 99-year terms), next eligible for parole in October 2025
| Incarcerated
| 
|-
|Gabriel Ross Parker
| March 3, 2002
| January 23, 2018
| 15 years, 10 months and 21 days
| Marshall County High School, Draffenville, Kentucky
| 
| 
| 
| Arrested and sentenced to life with a minimum of 20 years
| Incarcerated
|
|-
|Daniel Marsh
|  May 14, 1997
|  April 13, 2013
| 15 years, 10 months, and 30 days
| Davis, California 
|
|
|
|Arrested, convicted, and sentenced to life with parole eligibility after 25 years
|Incarcerated
|-
| Nicholas Waggoner Browning
| February 9, 1992
| February 1, 2008
| 15 years, 11 months, 24 days
| Cockeysville, Maryland
| 
| 
| 
| Murdered his parents and two younger brothers. Pled guilty to four counts of first-degree murder. Sentenced to four life sentences, with two terms to be served consecutively.
| Incarcerated
| 
|-
| Nathaniel Tennosuke Berhow
| November 14, 2003
| November 14, 2019
| 16 years, 0 months, and 0 days
| Santa Clarita, California
| 
| 
| 
| Died by suicide
| Deceased
| 
|-
|Unnamed boy
|?
|December 2017
|16
|Sneek
|
|
|
|
|
|
|-
| Pauline Parker
| c. 1938
| May 26, 1954
| 16
| Victoria Park, Christchurch
| 
| 
| 
| Arrested and sentenced to 5 years in prison
| Released
| 
|-
| Evan Ramsey
| February 8, 1981
| February 19, 1997
| 16 years and 11 days
| Bethel Regional High School, Bethel, Alaska
| 
| 
| 
| Arrested and sentenced to two sentences of 99 years in prison with an eligibility for parole in the year 2066
| Incarcerated
| 
|-
| Alec Devon Kreider
| February 4, 1991
| May 12, 2007
| 16 years, 1 month and 10 days
| Manheim Township, Lancaster County, Pennsylvania
| 
| 
| 
| Arrested; died by suicide 10 years into serving his three consecutive life without parole sentences
| Deceased
| 
|-
| Courtney Schulhoff
| December 27, 1987
| February 10, 2004
| 16 years, 1 month and 14 days
| Altamonte Springs, Florida
| 
| 
| 
| Arrested and sentenced to life without parole, later reduced to 40 years
| Imprisoned
| 
|-
| Daniel Petric
| August 24, 1991
| October 20, 2007
| 16 years, 1 month and 26 days
| Wellington, Ohio
| 
| 
| 
| Arrested and sentenced to life with 23 years before parole
| Incarcerated
| 
|-
| Melinda Loveless
| October 28, 1975
| January 11, 1992
| 16 years, 2 months and 14 days
| Madison, Indiana
| 
| 
| 
| Arrested, along with three other accomplices
| Released
| 
|-
|Richard Grissom
|November 10, 1960
|January 27, 1977
|16 years, 2 months and 17 days
|Lansing, Kansas
|
|
|
|Arrested, sentenced to three years at a boys reformatory. Released, then killed at least three more women in 1989
|Incarcerated
|
|
|-
| Martin Peyerl
| August 11, 1983
| November 1, 1999
| 16 years, 2 months and 21 days
| Bad Reichenhall, Germany
| 
| 
| 
| Died by suicide
| Deceased
| 
|-
| Sean Sellers
| May 18, 1969
| September 7, 1985
| 16 years, 3 months and 20 days
| Oklahoma City, Oklahoma
| 
| 
| 
| Arrested and executed
| Deceased
| 
|-
| David Brom
| October 3, 1971
| February 18, 1988
| 16 years, 4 months and 15 days
| Rochester, Minnesota
| 
| 
| 
| Arrested and sentenced to life in prison
| Incarcerated
| 
|-
| Marlene Olive
| January 15, 1959
| June 21, 1975
| 16 years, 5 months and 6 days
| Terra Linda, San Rafael, California
| 
| 
| 
| Arrested and sentenced to four to six years of confinement
| Unknown
| 
|-
| Sarah Marie Johnson
| January 24, 1987
| September 2, 2003
| 16 years, 7 months and 9 days
| Bellevue, Idaho
| 
| 
| 
| Arrested and sentenced to life without parole
| Incarcerated
| 
|-
| Jeff Weise
| August 8, 1988
| March 21, 2005
| 16 years, 7 months and 13 days
| Red Lake Senior High School, Red Lake, Minnesota
| 
| 
| 
| Died by suicide
| Deceased
| 
|-
| Luke Woodham
| February 5, 1981
| October 1, 1997
| 16 years, 7 months and 26 days
| Pearl High School, Pearl, Mississippi
| 
| 
| 
| Arrested
| Incarcerated
| 
|-
| Rod Ferrell
| March 28, 1980
| November 25, 1996
| 16, 7 months and 28 days
| Murray, Kentucky
| 
| 
| 
| Arrested and sentenced to life without parole
| Incarcerated
| 
|-
| Michael Bever
| November 4, 1998
| July 22, 2015
| 16, 8 months and 18 days
| Broken Arrow, Oklahoma
| 
| 
| 
| Arrested and sentenced to life imprisonment with the possibility of parole in 38 years 
| Incarcerated
| 
|-
| Éric Borel
| December 11, 1978
| September 23–24, 1995
| 16 years, 9 months and 12 days
| Cuers
| 
| 
| 
| Died by suicide
| Deceased
| 
|-
| Brenda Ann Spencer
| April 3, 1962
| January 29, 1979
| 16 years, 9 months and 26 days
| Cleveland Elementary School, San Diego, California
| 
| 
| 
| Arrested and sentenced to 25 years to life in prison
| Incarcerated
| 
|-
| Roberto Aparecido Alves Cardoso
| December 9, 1986
| November 5, 2003
| 16 years, 10 months and 27 days
| Embu-Guaçu
| 
| 
| 
| Sentenced to 3 years in prison, later interdicted and sent to an Experimental Health Unit
| Incarcerated
| 
|-
| Yukio Yamaji
| August 21, 1983
| July 29, 2000
| 16 years, 11 months and 8 days
| Yamaguchi, Yamaguchi Prefecture
| 
| 
| 
| Arrested and executed by hanging
| Deceased
| 
|-
| Scott Dyleski
| October 30, 1988
| October 15, 2005
| 16 years, 11 months and 15 days
| Lafayette, California
| 
| 
| 
| Arrested
| 
| 
|-
| Harold Wilkins
| c. 1916
| 1931–1932
| 16
| ?
| 
| 
| 
| Arrested, convicted and sentenced to death
| Deceased
| 
|-
| Seisaku Nakamura
| c. 1923–1924
| August 28, 1938
| 16
| Shizuoka Prefecture
| 
| 
| 
| Arrested; executed in 1943
| Deceased
| 
|-
| Leonard Shockley
| c. 1941–1942
| January 16, 1958
| 16
| Dorchester County, Maryland
| 
| 
| 
| Arrested; executed on April 10, 1959, at the age of 17
| Deceased
| 
|-
| Kevin Madden and Timothy Ferriman
| c. 1987
| November 25, 2003
| Both 16
| Toronto, Ontario
| 
| 
| 
| Both arrested
| 
| 
|-
| Nobuharu Minato
| c. 1982–1983
| January 4, 1989
| 16
| Misato, Saitama Prefecture, Kanto
| 
| 
| 
| Arrested, along with three accomplices
| 
| 
|-
| Brian Lee Draper and Torey Michael Adamcik
| c. 1990 and June 14, 1990
| September 22, 2006
| Both 16
| Pocatello, Idaho
| 
| 
| 
| Both arrested and sentenced to life without parole
| Incarcerated
| 
|-
| Sajal Barui
| c. 1976–1977
| November 22, 1993
| 16
| Kolkata
| 
| 
| 
| Arrested
| 
| 
|-
| John Odgren
| September 1, 1990
| January 19, 2007
| 16
| Lincoln-Sudbury Regional High School, Sudbury, Massachusetts
| 
| 
| 
| Arrested
| Incarcerated
| 
|-
| John Katehis
| c. 1992–1993
| March 20, 2009
| 16
| East Elmhurst, Queens, New York City
| 
| 
| 
| Arrested, sentenced to 25 years to life
| Incarcerated
| 
|-
| Unknown
| c. 1998
| March 2014
| 16
| Limpopo
| 
| 
| 
| Arrested
| 
| 
|-
| Abdulrahman Ali
| ?
| June 6, 2017
| 16
| London
| 
| 
| 
| Arrested
| 
| 
|-
|Ty Johnston
|
|April 27, 1977
|16
|St. Petersburg, Florida
|
|
|
|Arrested
|Released
|
|-
| Two unknown 16-year-olds
| c. 1992–1993
| June 6, 2009
| Both 16
| Stureby, Stockholm
| 
| 
| 
| Both arrested
| 
| 
|-
| James Ellison Rouse
| c. 1978
| November 15, 1995
| 17
| Richland High School, Lynnville, Tennessee
| 
| 
| 
| Arrested and sentenced to life without parole
| Incarcerated
| 
|-
| Bryan and David Freeman
| c. 1978–1979
| February 26, 1995
| 16–17
| Salisbury Township, Lehigh County, Pennsylvania
| 
| 
| 
| Arrested and sentenced to life without parole
| Incarcerated
| 
|-
|Unnamed boy
|?
|December 2017
|17
|Sneek
|
|
|
|
|
|
|-
|Edward George McGregor
|March 29, 1973
|April 17, 1990
|17 years and 23 days
|Missouri City
|
|
|
|Arrested in 2006 after DNA linked him to the murder. It was discovered that he murdered at least three other women as an adult. Sentenced to life in prison without parole.
|Incarcerated
|
|-
| Laurie Tackett
| October 5, 1974
| January 11, 1992
| 17 years, 3 months and 7 days
| Madison, Indiana
| 
| 
| 
| Arrested, along with three other accomplices
| Released
| 
|-
| TJ Lane
| September 19, 1994
| February 27, 2012
| 17 years, 5 months and 8 days
| Chardon, Ohio
| 
| 
| 
| Arrested, sentenced to life without parole
| Incarcerated
| 
|-
| Nicole Louise Pearce (formerly Paul Wayne Luckman)
| November 1, 1964
| May 4, 1982
| 17 years, 6 months and 3 days
| Kingscliff, New South Wales
| 
| 
| 
| Arrested, sentenced to life imprisonment
| Incarcerated
| 
|-
| Peter Woodcock
| March 5, 1939
| September 15, 1956 – January 19, 1957
| 17 years, 6 months and 10 days - 17 years, 10 months and 14 days
| Peterborough, Ontario
| 
| 
| 
| Arrested
| Deceased
| 
|-
| Daniel LaPlante
| May 16, 1970
| December 1, 1987
| 17 years, 6 months and 15 days
| Townsend, Massachusetts
| 
| 
| 
| Arrested and sentenced to three consecutive life sentences with the possibility of parole in 45 years 
| Incarcerated
| 
|-
| Dalton Prejean
| December 10, 1959
| July 2, 1977
| 17 years, 6 months and 22 days
| Lafayette Parish, Louisiana
| 
| 
| 
| Arrested, sentenced to death and executed
| Deceased
| 
|-
| Dylan Klebold
| September 11, 1981
| April 20, 1999
| 17 years, 7 months and 9 days
| Littleton, Colorado
| 
| 
| 
| Died by suicide
| Deceased
| 
|-
| Tim Kretschmer
| July 26, 1991
| March 11, 2009
| 17 years, 7 months and 13 days
| Winnenden, Baden-Württemberg
| 
| 
| 
| Died by suicide
| Deceased
| 
|-
| Harvey Miguel Robinson
| December 6, 1974
| August 1992
| 17 and 8 months
| Allentown, Pennsylvania
| 
| 
| 
| Arrested and sentenced to life without parole for one murder committed at age 17 and death for two murders committed at age 18
| Incarcerated
| 
|-
| Otoya Yamaguchi
| February 22, 1943
| October 12, 1960
| 17 years, 8 months and 11 days
| Hibiya Hall, Tokyo
| 
| 
| 
| Arrested; died by suicide before trial
| Deceased
|
|-
| Austin Sigg
| January 17, 1995
| October 5, 2012
| 17 years, 8 months and 18 days
| Westminster, Colorado
| 
| 
| 
| Arrested and sentenced to life imprisonment with the possibility of parole after 40 years plus 82 years
| Incarcerated
| 
|-
| Ove Conry Andersson
| c. 1944–1945
| March 4, 1961
| 17
| Kungälv, Västra Götaland
| 
| 
| 
| Arrested; died by suicide in prison in 2008
| Deceased
| 
|-
| Anthony Barbaro
| c. 1956–1957
| December 30, 1974
| 17
| Olean High School, Olean, New York
| 
| 
| 
| Arrested; died by suicide less than a year into his sentence
| Deceased
| 
|-
| James Terry Roach
| February 18, 1960
| 1976
| 17
| Columbia, South Carolina
| 
| 
| 
| Arrested, sentenced to execution 10 years later
| Deceased
| 
|-
| Jo Ogura
| c. 1981–1982
| January 4, 1989
| 17
| Misato, Saitama Prefecture, Kanto
| 
| 
| 
| Arrested, along with three accomplices
| 
| 
|-
| Yasushi Watanabe
| c. 1981–1982
| January 4, 1989
| 17
| Misato, Saitama Prefecture, Kanto
| 
| 
| 
| Arrested, along with three accomplices
| 
| 
|-
| Gary Scott Pennington
| c. 1975–1976
| January 18, 1993
| 17
| Grayson, Kentucky
| 
| 
| 
| Arrested
| Incarcerated
| 
|-
| Hendrik Möbus, Sebastian Schauseil, and Andreas Kirchner
| c. 1975–1976
| April 29, 1993
| All 17
| Sondershausen
| 
| 
| 
| All arrested
| 
| 
|-
| Alex Baranyi and David Anderson
| c. 1979–1980
| January 3–4, 1997
| Both 17
| Bellevue, Washington
| 
| 
| 
| Both arrested and sentenced to life sentences without the possibility of parole
| Incarcerated
| 
|-
| Unknown 17-year-old male
| c. 1982–1983
| May 4–5, 2000
| 17
| Dazaifu, Fukuoka
| 
| 
| 
| Arrested
| 
| 
|-
| Delara Darabi
| September 29, 1986
| 2003
| 17
| Rasht
| 
| 
| 
| Arrested, sentenced to execution 6 years later
| Deceased
| 
|-
| Gary Hirte
| c. 1986
| July 23, 2003
| 17
| Winnebago County, Wisconsin
| 
| 
| 
| Arrested and sentenced to life imprisonment with the possibility of parole after 32 years
| Incarcerated
| 
|-
| Tyler Hadley
| c. 1993–1994
| July 16, 2011
| 17
| Port St. Lucie, Florida
| 
| 
| 
| Arrested and sentenced to life without parole
| Imprisoned
| 
|-
| Mathieu Moulinas
| c. 1993–1994
| November 11, 2011
| 17
| Le Chambon-sur-Lignon
| 
| 
| 
| Arrested and sentenced to life in prison
| Incarcerated
| 
|-
| Wu Jiangguo
| c. 2000
| May 15, 2017
| 17
| Maoming
| 
| 
| 
| Arrested
| 
| 
|-
| Randan Fontaine
| c. 1998–1999
| January 22, 2016
| 17
| La Loche, Saskatchewan
| 
| 
| 
| Arrested and sentenced to life imprisonment with no chance of parole for 10 years
|
| 
|-
|Olga Tamarin
|c. 1892
|1909
|17
|Kurdino, Novaya Ladoga
|
|
|
|Arrested and convicted
|Deceased
|
|- 
| De'Marquise Elkins
| 1995
| March 21, 2013
| 17
| Brunswick, Georgia
| 
| 
| 
| Arrested and convicted of felony murder, malice murder, cruelty to children and possession of a handgun during a crime and sentenced to life without parole
| Incarcerated
|

See also 
 Capital punishment for juveniles in the United States

References 

Killers
 
Killers, youngest
youngest
youngest